The SunBreak is an online magazine in Seattle, Washington, founded in September 2009 by Michael van Baker, formerly an editor for Seattlest.

The SunBreak'''s coverage of a 2011 bicyclist fatality was noted by major conventional media outlets Seattle Post-Intelligencer and KPLU News. SunBreak'' is listed as a significant media outlet for Cascade Bicycle Club's bicycle advocacy campaigns.

References

External links

2009 establishments in Washington (state)
Magazines established in 2009
Magazines published in Seattle
Online magazines published in the United States